Di Biase may refer to:

Anthony Di Biase (born 1988), Canadian soccer player
David Di Biase (1935-2001),  British dentist
Michael Di Biase (born 1947), former Regional Councillor, deputy mayor and mayor of Vaughan, Ontario
Moreno Di Biase (born 1975), Italian former professional racing cyclist
Nico di Biase (born 1988), Argentine professional footballer

See also 
DiBiase (disambiguation)
Dibiasi, a surname